Primordial dwarfism (PD) is a form of dwarfism that results in a smaller body size in all stages of life beginning from before birth. More specifically, primordial dwarfism is a diagnostic category including specific types of profoundly proportionate dwarfism, in which individuals are extremely small for their age, even as a fetus. Most individuals with primordial dwarfism are not diagnosed until they are about 3–5 years of age.

Medical professionals typically diagnose the fetus as being small for gestational age, or as showing intrauterine growth restriction when an ultrasound is conducted. Typically, people with primordial dwarfism are born with very low birth weights. After birth, growth continues at a much slower rate, leaving individuals with primordial dwarfism perpetually years behind their peers in stature and in weight.

Most cases of short stature are caused by skeletal or endocrine disorders. The five subtypes of primordial dwarfism are among the most severe forms of the 200 types of dwarfism.

There are as yet no effective treatments for primordial dwarfism. It is rare for individuals affected by primordial dwarfism to live past the age of 30. In the case of microcephalic osteodysplastic primordial dwarfism type II (MOPDII), there can be increased risk of vascular problems, which may cause premature death.

Causes 
It is known that PD is caused by inheriting a mutant gene from each parent. The lack of normal growth in the disorder is not due to a deficiency of growth hormone, as in hypopituitary dwarfism. Administering growth hormone, therefore, has little or no effect on the growth of the individual with primordial dwarfism, except in the case of Russell–Silver syndrome (RSS). Individuals with RSS respond favorably to growth hormone treatment. Children with RSS that are treated with growth hormone before puberty may achieve several inches of additional height. In January 2008, it was published that mutations in the pericentrin gene (PCNT) were found to cause primordial dwarfism. Pericentrin has a role in cell division, proper chromosome segregation and cytokinesis.

Another gene that has been implicated in this condition is DNA2. Mutations in this gene have been implicated in Seckel syndrome.

Diagnosis
Since primordial dwarfism disorders are extremely rare, misdiagnosis is common. Because children with PD do not grow like other children, poor nutrition, a metabolic disorder, or a digestive disorder may be diagnosed initially. The correct diagnosis of PD may not be made until the child is 5 years old and it becomes apparent that the child has severe dwarfism.

Types

Notable cases 
 Jyoti Amge - Indian actress, world's shortest woman since her 18th birthday on 16 December 2011
 Caroline Crachami – known as the "Sicilian Fairy", displayed in the Hunterian Museum in Scotland
 Chandra Bahadur Dangi – smallest man of all time
 Nelson de la Rosa – actor linked to the USA baseball team Boston Red Sox
 Aditya Dev – world's smallest bodybuilder
 Bridgette Jordan and Brad Jordan – siblings
 Khagendra Thapa Magar – world's shortest man from his 18th birthday on 14 October 2010 to 13 June 2011
 Gul Mohammed – former smallest man of all time
 He Pingping – world's shortest ambulatory man until his death in 2010
 Weng Weng – Filipino actor and martial artist
 Lucía Zárate – Mexican entertainer and first person identified to have MOPD II
 Kenadie Jourdin-Bromley – 'Thumbelina', she is a medical wonder, actress in the film: Lep. She stands 33 inches tall and weighs 17 pounds, roughly the size of an 18-month-old toddler.
 Sienna Bernal – world's rarest discordant twinning

See also
 Gigantism
 Dwarfism
 Psychogenic dwarfism
 List of people with dwarfism

References

Growth disorders
Genetic diseases and disorders